Aleksandr Semyonovich Anpilogov (born January 18, 1954) is a former Soviet/Georgian handball player who competed in the 1976 Summer Olympics and in the 1980 Summer Olympics.

Anpilogov trained at Burevestnik in Tbilisi. In 1976 he won the gold medal with the Soviet team. He played all six matches and scored 13 goals.

Four years later he was part of the Soviet team which won the silver medal. He played all six matches and scored 29 goals.

References

External links
 
  More Pictures of Aleksandr Anpilogov

1954 births
Living people
Sportspeople from Tbilisi
Soviet male handball players
Male handball players from Georgia (country)
Burevestnik (sports society) athletes
Handball players at the 1976 Summer Olympics
Handball players at the 1980 Summer Olympics
Olympic handball players of the Soviet Union
Olympic gold medalists for the Soviet Union
Olympic silver medalists for the Soviet Union
Olympic medalists in handball
Medalists at the 1980 Summer Olympics
Medalists at the 1976 Summer Olympics